Navalpattu is a census town in Tiruchirappalli district in the Indian state of Tamil Nadu. Navalpattu is a part of Tiruchirappalli urban agglomeration. The city's only IT park is based here.

Demographics
 India census, Navalpattu had a population of 16,020. Males constitute 49% of the population and females 51%. Navalpattu has an average literacy rate of 77%, higher than the national average of 59.5%: male literacy is 82%, and female literacy is 71%. In Navalpattu, 9% of the population is under 6 years of age.

References

Neighbourhoods and suburbs of Tiruchirappalli
Villages in Tiruchirappalli district